Chasles may mean:

Michel Chasles (1793–1880), mathematician
Philarète Chasles (1798–1873), writer and critic
Pierre Jacques Michel Chasles (1754–1826), revolutionist, father of Philarète
Emile Chasles (1827–?), philologist, son of Philarète